Derek Gaudet (born May 14, 1989 in Bayside, Nova Scotia) is a Canadian soccer player, who currently plays for Halifax Dunbrack SC in the Nova Scotia Soccer League.

Career

Club
Gaudet began his career with Halifax County United and signed in 2004 with Halifax Dunbrack where he played for four years.
Gaudet signed a contract with Toronto FC in August 2008. He made his professional debut on 6 September 2008, coming on as a substitute for Diaz Kambere against Chivas USA.  On March 3, 2010 the Portland Timbers announced the signing of Gaudet to a contract for the 2010 season. Gaudet played two years for Saint Mary's Huskies and played club soccer for Dunbrack Halifax.

International
Gaudet was a member of the Canadian U-15 , U-17 and U-20 national teams. He has also represented Nova Scotia at numerous national championships and at the 2005 Canada Games. On 18 January 2010 earned his first call-up for the Canada men's national soccer team for a training camp in Florida.

Coaching career 
Head coach of Halifax Dunbrack Sr. Women's "A". Winning 4 provincial titles in 2014, 2015, 2016 and 2017 
On June 12, 2012 was named Technical coach of youth players at Sackville United Soccer Club  Gaudet formed also in June 2012 the High Performance Futbol Academy in Halifax, Nova Scotia.

Honours
 2009: Nova Scotia Soccer League Premiership MVP

References

http://www.dbq.edu/Athletics/WomensAthletics/Soccer/

External links
 
 Portland Timbers bio
 Atlantic University Sport bio

1989 births
Living people
Canadian people of Acadian descent
Canadian soccer players
Association football midfielders
Soccer people from Nova Scotia
People from the Halifax Regional Municipality
Toronto FC players
Portland Timbers (2001–2010) players
Expatriate soccer players in the United States
Canadian expatriate soccer players
Major League Soccer players
USSF Division 2 Professional League players
Canada men's youth international soccer players
Canadian soccer coaches
2009 CONCACAF U-20 Championship players
Saint Mary's Huskies soccer players